Charles Draper Faulkner (March 11, 1890 – December 31, 1979) was a Chicago-based American architect renowned for the churches and other buildings that he  designed in the United States and Japan. He designed over 33 Christian Science church buildings and wrote a book called  Christian Science Church Edifices.

Early life and education
Charles Draper Faulkner  was born in San Francisco, California, After graduating from Calumet High School in Chicago, he went to Armour Institute of Technology, now Illinois Institute of Technology and in 1913 received a B.S. in Architecture. Most of his senior year at A.I.T. was spent on a traveling scholarship in Canada and six countries in Europe.

Career history
From 1913 to 1917 he worked as chief designer for renowned Chicago architect Solon Spencer Beman. In 1919 he opened his own firm in Chicago. From 1935-1937 he also did work for the U.S. government. After his son, Charles Draper Faulkner, Jr., joined him in the practice, he changed his firm name to Faulkner, Faulkner & Associates. He was a member of the Chicago chapter of the A.I.A. and held various offices from 1946 to 1954.

Works
The works of Charles Draper Faulkner include: Nippersink Resort buildings Genoa City, WI
The Shinner Memorial Playground Clubhouse 1932

Christian Science churches
 Note: all Churches of Christ, Scientist, are numbered: First, Second, Third, etc.

Japan
 First, Tokyo

United States

Other buildings
 Beverly Unitarian Church, school building, 1959, Chicago
 Good Shepherd United Protestant Church, 1957, Park Forest
 Oakhaven Old People's Home, 1922, Chicago, with Charles Sumner Duke
 Trinity Episcopal Church, 1958, Wheaton, Illinois
 6737 S Bennett Avenue, 1927, Chicago, Illinois
 6835 S Bennett Avenue, 1925, Chicago, Illinois
 6907 S Bennett Avenue, 1926, Chicago, Illinois
 6921 S Bennett Avenue, 1910s, Chicago, Illinois
 6841 S Constance Avenue, 1920s, Chicago, Illinois
 6845 S Constance Avenue, 1925, Chicago, Illinois
 6757 S Cregier Avenue, 1920s, Chicago, Illinois
 2666 E 73rd Street,   1928,  Chicago, Illinois
 2309 E 71st Street, 1920s, Chicago, Illinois

Death
In 1979, Charles Draper Faulkner died a resident of Downers Grove, Illinois.

References

External links
 Historic Designation study report: contains a biography

1890 births
1979 deaths
Architects from San Francisco
Architects from Chicago
Illinois Institute of Technology alumni
American ecclesiastical architects